The 2016 Men's Hockey Junior World Cup was the 11th edition of the Hockey Junior World Cup for men, an international field hockey tournament. It was held in Lucknow, India from 8–18 December 2016. A total of sixteen teams competed for the title.

Host nation India won the tournament for the second time after defeating Belgium 2–1 in the final. Germany won the third-place match by defeating Australia 3–0.

Qualification
Each continental federation got a number of quotas depending on the FIH World Rankings for teams qualified through their junior continental championships. Alongside the host nation, 15 other teams will compete in the tournament. Pakistan officially qualified for the tournament through their position in the Junior Asia Cup but later were replaced by Malaysia due to not meeting the FIH deadline for submitting entries.

Umpires
Below are the 14 umpires appointed by the International Hockey Federation:

Deepak Joshi (India)
Aziz Adimah (Ghana)
Dan Barstow (England)
Tim Bond (New Zealand)
Sherif Elamari (Egypt)
Pietro Galligani (Italy)
Federico Garcia (Uruguay)
Ben Göntgen (Germany)
Gabriel Labate (Argentina)
Sebastien Michielsen (Belgium)
Zeke Newman (Australia)
Sean Rapaport (South Africa)
Suolong You (China)
David Sweetman (Scotland)

Squads

First round
All times are Indian Standard Time (UTC+05:30).

Pool A

Pool B

Pool C

Pool D

Classification round

Thirteenth to sixteenth place classification

Cross-overs

Fifteenth and sixteenth place

Thirteenth and fourteenth place

Ninth to twelfth place classification

Cross-overs

Eleventh and twelfth place

Ninth and tenth place

Medal round

Bracket

Quarter-finals

Fifth to eighth place classification

Cross-overs

Seventh and eighth place

Fifth and sixth place

First to fourth place classification

Semi-finals

Third and fourth place

Final

Awards

Statistics

Final standings

Goalscorers

See also
2016 Women's Hockey Junior World Cup

References

External links

 
Junior World Cup
2016 Men's Hockey Junior World Cup
Men's Hockey Junior World Cup
Hockey Junior World Cup
Men's Hockey Junior World Cup
2016 in youth sport
Sport in Lucknow